Willem Hermansz. van Diest (c. 1600 in The Hague – c. 1678 in The Hague), was a Dutch Golden Age seascape painter.

He was the father of the painter Jeronymus van Diest and a follower of Jan van Goyen, Jan Porcellis and Simon de Vlieger. In 1656 he helped set up the Confrerie Pictura.

References

1600s births
1670s deaths
Artists from The Hague
Dutch Golden Age painters
Dutch male painters
Dutch marine artists
Painters from The Hague